John Gray House is a historic home located at Port Matilda, Patton Township, Centre County, Pennsylvania. It was built in 1793, and is a -story, five-bay, stone dwelling with an exposed basement.  The interior has a traditional Georgian center hall plan.

It was added to the National Register of Historic Places in 1975.

References

Houses on the National Register of Historic Places in Pennsylvania
Georgian architecture in Pennsylvania
Houses completed in 1793
Houses in Centre County, Pennsylvania
National Register of Historic Places in Centre County, Pennsylvania
1793 establishments in Pennsylvania